Bilal Baig is a Canadian writer and actor, most noted for their play Acha Bacha and television series Sort Of. Acha Bacha, which centers on a non-binary Pakistani-Canadian person struggling to reconcile their gender with their Muslim upbringing, was staged in a joint production by Theatre Passe Muraille and Buddies in Bad Times in 2018.

Baig is the co-creator, co-writer, and star of Sort Of, a CBC Television comedy series centering on a genderfluid character. Baig is the first queer South Asian Muslim actor to lead a Canadian primetime television series. The series premiered on CBC in 2021.

Although Sort Of was the top winner overall in television categories at the 10th Canadian Screen Awards in 2022, Baig notably refused to submit for consideration at all due to the gender division between Best Actor in a Comedy Series and Best Actress in a Comedy Series. The Academy of Canadian Cinema and Television subsequently announced that beginning with the 11th Canadian Screen Awards in 2023, gender-neutral awards for Best Performance will be presented instead of separate gendered actor and actress categories.

Theatre credits

Filmography

Television

References

21st-century Canadian actors
21st-century Canadian dramatists and playwrights
Canadian non-binary actors
Canadian television actors
Canadian stage actors
Canadian people of Pakistani descent
Canadian Muslims
Canadian LGBT dramatists and playwrights
LGBT Muslims
Canadian non-binary writers
Non-binary dramatists and playwrights
Actors from Ontario
Writers from Mississauga
Living people
21st-century Canadian LGBT people
1995 births
Genderfluid people
Queer actors